Thorectidae is a family of sea sponges in the order Dictyoceratida.

Genera
Subfamily Phyllospongiinae Keller, 1889
Candidaspongia Bergquist, Sorokin & Karuso, 1999
Carteriospongia Hyatt, 1877
Lendenfeldia Bergquist, 1980
Phyllospongia Ehlers, 1870
Strepsichordaia Bergquist, Ayling & Wilkinson, 1988
Subfamily Thorectinae Bergquist, 1978
Aplysinopsis von Lendenfeld, 1888
Cacospongia Schmidt, 1862
Collospongia Bergquist, Cambie & Kernan, 1990
Dactylospongia Bergquist, 1965
Fascaplysinopsis Bergquist, 1980
Fasciospongia Burton, 1934
Fenestraspongia Bergquist, 1980
Hyrtios Duchassaing de Fonbressin & Michelotti, 1864
Luffariella Thiele, 1899
Narrabeena de Cook & Bergquist, 2002
Petrosaspongia Bergquist, 1995
Scalarispongia de Cook & Bergquist, 2000
Semitaspongia de Cook & Bergquist, 2000
Smenospongia Wiedenmayer, 1977
Taonura Carter, 1882
Thorecta von Lendenfeld, 1888
Thorectandra von Lendenfeld, 1889
Thorectaxia Pulitzer-Finali & Pronzato, 1999

References

External links

 
Sponge families
Taxa named by Patricia Bergquist